Henri Baudouin (18 June 1926 – 26 May 2020) was a French politician who served as a Deputy between 1962 and 1986. He was twice mayor of Granville, from 1961 to 1977, and again from 1983 to 1989.

He was born in Ille-et-Vilaine, on 18 June 1926, and trained as a lawyer. Over the course of his tenure in the National Assembly, Baudouin represented the Union for the New Republic, Union of Democrats for the Republic, Independent Republicans, and Union for French Democracy. He was awarded Chevalier of the Légion d'honneur.

References

1926 births
2020 deaths
Deputies of the 2nd National Assembly of the French Fifth Republic
Union for French Democracy politicians
Deputies of the 3rd National Assembly of the French Fifth Republic
Deputies of the 4th National Assembly of the French Fifth Republic
Deputies of the 5th National Assembly of the French Fifth Republic
Deputies of the 6th National Assembly of the French Fifth Republic
Deputies of the 7th National Assembly of the French Fifth Republic
Mayors of places in Normandy
Chevaliers of the Légion d'honneur
20th-century French lawyers
Independent Republicans politicians
People from Ille-et-Vilaine
Union of Democrats for the Republic politicians
People from Granville, Manche
Union for the New Republic politicians
Politicians from Brittany